Avatar: The Last Airbender – The Promise is a graphic novel in three parts written by Gene Yang and illustrated by Studio Gurihiru, the first in a series of graphic novel trilogies serving as both a continuation of the Avatar: The Last Airbender and a prequel to The Legend of Korra, both animated television series created by Michael Dante DiMartino and Bryan Konietzko. Part 1 was released on January 25, 2012, Part 2 was released on May 30, 2012 and Part 3 was released on September 26, 2012.

The events of The Promise begin immediately after the last episode of the original series, "Avatar Aang", before jumping forward one whole year. It is followed by Avatar: The Last Airbender – The Search.

Overview
Although the one-hundred-year War is finally over, tensions run high as one-hundred- thirteen-year-old Avatar Aang and seventeen-year-old Zuko are put on a "collision course" after the Avatar travels to a Fire Nation colony named Yu Dao, and finds "tension between neighbors" – a threat that may shatter the world's newfound peace.

The unfinished conversation between Zuko and Ozai about the whereabouts of Ursa, Zuko's long-lost mother, is completed, but the conversation takes a different path after Zuko asks the question and her fate still remains unknown. Zuko forces Aang to promise to kill him if he becomes like his father, the deposed Fire Lord Ozai.

Negotiations with Earth King Kuei and the beginning of the Harmony Restoration Movement commence. The movement plans to take the people in the Fire Nation colonies and move them into the Fire Nation itself. However, an unexpected controversy breaks out, as the older colonies are composed of people who have never lived within the Fire Nation and have intermarried with Earth Kingdom citizens. These people view the movement as robbing them of their homes. Fire Lord Zuko is caught between the desires of his people and the demands of many who believe peace and balance is only attainable if Fire Nation citizens return to their country. When the Earth Kingdom army arrives to enforce the Restoration Movement, Zuko deploys his own forces in defense of the colonies, leading to an explosive showdown between the recently belligerent sides and threatening to reignite the fires of war. Aang must decide whether to follow through on his promise, and decide the fate of the colonies in the process.

In the midst of this dispute, Toph's new metal bending school finds itself in trouble, while Aang is confronted with the "Avatar Fan Movement," a growing group of young individuals trying to live as the air nomads did, but Aang views these people as parodying and denigrating the memory of his people.

Plot

Part One
Following Fire Lord Ozai's defeat and the conclusion of the Hundred Year War, the Harmony Restoration Movement is established to remove the Fire Nation Colonies in the Earth Kingdom and relocate the colonists to the Fire Nation. Having become the new Fire Lord, Zuko makes Aang promise to kill him if he turns out like his father.

One year later, Zuko survives an attempt on his life made by Kori Morishita, in protest against the Harmony Restoration Movement. Learning that Kori is the daughter of the Mayor of Yu Dao, the first colony created by the Fire Nation, Zuko travels to the city to confront the Morishita family. He learns that over the last century, the Fire Nation colonists have become deeply integrated with the original Earth Kingdom citizens, to the point that there are now mixed-race families, industries that use expertise from both cultures, and Earthbenders who consider themselves Fire Nation citizens, including Kori. Realizing that the Harmony Restoration Movement would bring an end to this, Zuko withdraws his support for it.

Zuko's decision causes protests from Earth Kingdom citizens, including the Freedom Fighters, who believe that Zuko is refusing to give up the colonies, and prompts Aang, Katara and Sokka to travel to Yu Dao to confront him. Aang's predecessor Avatar Roku urges Aang to fulfill his promise to Zuko, reminding him that his own failure to kill Fire Lord Sozin led to the Hundred Year War happening in the first place. Arriving in Yu Dao, Aang and Katara get into a fight with Zuko and his troops, and Aang nearly goes into the Avatar State, but he is talked out of it by Katara.
 
Despite seeing the prosperity of Yu Dao for himself, Aang insists that the Fire Nation cannot keep occupying part of the Earth Kingdom if the world is to live in harmony. Katara suggests that Yu Dao be the exception to this rule, but Zuko states that the same should be done for the remaining colonies. Although doubtful, Aang agrees to try to get Earth King Kuei to talk with Zuko on what to do. The Earth Kingdom protestors are unhappy with Aang's decision, having suffered the presence of the colonies for over a century, and give him three days before they attempt to retake the city for themselves. Returning to the Fire Nation, Zuko visits his imprisoned father, Ozai, for advice.

Part Two
Aang and Katara travel to the city of Ba Sing Se to meet with Kuei. Upon arriving in the metropolis, Aang learns that an Avatar Aang fan club has been set up to honor him. Aang briefly enjoys the company of his fans, since they remind him of his old life among the Air Nomads. The two teenagers then try to convince Kuei to meet with Zuko, but the Earth King, in an attempt to appear strong after Long Feng's manipulation of him, states that he will order troops to Yu Dao to ensure the completion of the Harmony Restoration movement (HRM). Aang and Katara return to Yu Dao to try and convince the colonists to evacuate before the Earth Kingdom army arrives.

In the Fire Nation, Ozai talks about Zuko's indecisiveness, referring to an event from Zuko's childhood in which it nearly got him killed. Zuko interprets the story as his father saying that he should side with the stronger side in the conflict, but Ozai tells him that, as Fire Lord, whatever decision he makes is the right one, by virtue of the fact that he made it. Correctly predicting Kuei's response to the Yu Dao crisis, Ozai urges his son to do whatever is necessary to protect his citizens, viewing them as an expression of the Fire Lord's will. Zuko subsequently becomes reluctant to do so, out of fear that he would be no different from his father.

In a subplot, Sokka learns that Toph's Metalbending Academy, which she set up in Yu Dao following the end of the Hundred Year War, has been taken over by a rival Firebending Dojo as a result of Zuko's opposition to the HRM. Sokka and the Firebending master agree to a match between Toph's students and his disciples in three days, but Sokka is unaware that Toph's students don't know how to bend metal. After several unsuccessful attempts to get the students metalbending, Toph gives up, explaining to Sokka that while she recruited her students with the belief that they could become metalbenders, she feels that she's been trying to force them to become something they're not, similar to how her parents treated her. Toph's students overhear the conversation, and upon realizing that Toph believed that they could become more than what they were, they are inspired to figure out how to metalbend, and subsequently win the match.

Zuko's girlfriend Mai learns about his meetings with Ozai from a bodyguard. Upset that Zuko would keep secrets from her, Mai breaks up with him. Shortly afterwards, Zuko learns that Kuei's army is marching towards Yu Dao. Sadly admitting that his father was right, Zuko mobilizes his own forces to defend the colonists.

Part Three
Returning to Yu Dao, Aang and Katara learn that the people of the city have formed the Yu Dao Resistance, in response to the Earth Kingdom protesters, with Sneers as one of the members. Aang also encounters the Yu Dao chapter of the Avatar Aang Fan Club, who had been informed of the approaching conflict by the Ba Sing Se chapter, but becomes offended when he sees the members wearing airbending master tattoos, considering this an insult against his culture. He subsequently decides to see the HRM through to the end, believing that harmony can only be achieved when all four nations are separate, as stronger nations cannot help but hurt or make fun of weaker ones. Leaving the scene with Aang, Katara, who no longer supports the HRM, starts to explain how she saw more than just Kori and her family when she saw Yu Dao, but is interrupted by an attempt by the protesters to force entry into the city.

As Aang and Katara unsuccessfully attempt to stop the protesters, Sokka, Toph and Suki, who had warned the other two about Zuko's intentions, attempt to delay the Fire Nation forces, fearing that another war will start when the two armies meet. Despite their best efforts, Zuko's army meets up with the Earth Kingdom army led by General Hao. Arriving on the scene, Aang goes into the Avatar State, while berating Zuko for giving up on the Harmony Restoration Movement. Katara again manages to talk him down, and explains that when she saw the Morishitas, a family with the heritage of two nations, she saw her and Aang's future, and asks what separating the nations will mean for the two of them. At her advice, Aang leaves the scene in order to decide on a course of action, whilst his friends and the Avatar Aang Fan Club attempt to stop the fighting. As Aang meditates, Roku again tells Aang to think of the world above all else and fulfill his promise, revealing that he is Zuko's great-grandfather on his mother's side. Aang is horrified that Roku would consider killing his great-grandson for the sake of harmony.

During the battle, Katara forces her way onto the blimp that Kuei is watching the battle from, and realizes that the Earth King is unaware of the true nature of Yu Dao, having never been there himself. She convinces him to come down to the city and see the people who will have to live with his decisions. As Zuko and General Hao prepare to do battle, Aang arrives in the Avatar State. Believing that the Avatar has come to kill him, Zuko protests, before sadly admitting that he is doing exactly what his father would have done. Aang instead uses his Earthbending to create a huge chasm around Yu Dao, cutting the two armies off from the city, and rescues Zuko when the latter nearly jumps into it. He introduces Kuei to the Yu Dao resistance and explains that the Earth King is not just fighting a colony, but a new kind of world. Kuei begins to understand the situation, while Zuko, faced with the revelation that he has been in the right all along, collapses.

Four days afterwards, Aang severs his connection with Roku, stating that the world is very different from when the last Avatar lived, and that he cannot think of the world without thinking of his friends, including Zuko, and Zuko wakes up from a 4-day sleep. Aang, Kuei and Zuko agree to meet and discuss the fate of Yu Dao, Zuko and Aang both believing that it must become something other than a Fire Nation colony or an Earth Kingdom city. Zuko also apologizes for having Aang make his promise in the first place, viewing it as a way to save him from having to choose between right and wrong. Aang also tells Zuko that it is not entirely his fault and that he should have some faith in himself.
Iroh also makes them both some bubble tea, which they both spit out due to the taste. Iroh frowns and says that he is a man ahead of his time since others cannot appreciate his new invention.   Aang decides to teach the Avatar Aang Fan Club the ways of the Air Nomads in order to preserve their culture, dubbing them the Air Acolytes. The book – and by extension, the trilogy – end with Zuko talking with his sister Azula, now incarcerated in a mental institution, about searching for their mother.

Publication
Since the conclusion of the original series in July 2008, fans of Avatar: The Last Airbender had demanded a more satisfying denouement in relation to the fates of the main characters. In late 2010, Samantha Robertson, an editor at Dark Horse Comics at the time, approached comic author Gene Yang, who was best known for his American Born Chinese series. After "some conversations" with her and the creators of Avatar: The Last Airbender, Michael Dante DiMartino and Bryan Konietzko, Yang was contracted to write three comic books to serve as a direct continuation of the original series. Yang's approach to the writing of The Promise was purported to be "purist", and he collaborated closely with DiMartino and Konietzko.

Reception

The Promise Part 1 has received mostly positive reviews, with Convention Scene praising Yang's portrayal of the characters. Convention Scene also praised Gurihiru Studio's artwork, stating that it did justice to the series. The Seattle Post-Intelligencer called the graphic novel an "enjoyable read even if you are not well versed in the story's universe."

References

2012 graphic novels
Promise, The
Dark Horse Comics titles
Prequel comics
Sequel comics
Graphic novels by Gene Luen Yang